The Best of Chapterhouse is a greatest hits compilation album by English Shoegazing band Chapterhouse released in 2007 on CD. The inner sleeve features a brief history of Chapterhouse written by Michael Heatley.

Track listing
 "We Are the Beautiful" (from Blood Music) – 4:15
 "Falling Down" (from Whirlpool) – 3:57
 "Pearl" (from Whirlpool) – 5:16
 "Mesmerise" (from Mesmerise) – 4:14
 "Autosleeper" (from Whirlpool) – 4:49
 "Come Heaven" (from Whirlpool 2006 Reissue) – 5:33
 "Breather" (from Whirlpool) – 4:20
 "She's a Vision" (from Blood Music) – 4:12
 "There's Still Life" (from Blood Music) – 5:03
 "Love Forever" (from Blood Music) – 6:00
 "Then We'll Rise" (from Mesmerise) – 4:15
 "In My Arms" (from Whirlpool 2006 Reissue) – 4:41
 "Ecstasy II" – 3:51
 "Something More" (from Whirlpool) – 3:19
 "On the Way to Fly" (from Blood Music) – 4:25

References 

Chapterhouse albums
2007 greatest hits albums
Dedicated Records compilation albums